South of the Border may refer to:

Music 
 "South of the Border" (1939 song), popular song, notably recorded by Gene Autry, as well as Frank Sinatra
 South of the Border (Caterina Valente album), 1963
 South of the Border (Herb Alpert's Tijuana Brass album), 1964
 South of the Border (David Murray album), 1993
 "South of the Border" (Robbie Williams song), 1997
 "South of the Border" (Ed Sheeran song), 2019

Film and television 
 South of the Border (1939 film), Gene Autry film featuring June Storey
 South of the Border with Disney, 1942 short documentary film
 South of the Border (2009 film), 2009 documentary by Oliver Stone
 South of the Border, alternative title for the 2006 South Korean film Over the Border
 South of the Border, situation comedy produced by Yorkshire Television in 1985
 South of the Border, two-part episode of My Name Is Earl
 South of the Border, detective drama which ran for two series on BBC1 in 1988 and 1990

Other uses 
 South of the Border (attraction), rest stop and roadside attraction in North/South Carolina, U.S.

Colloquialism 
 England and Wales, in Scotland
 Mexico, in the United States
 United States, in Canada

See also 
 North of the Border (disambiguation)